This is a list of members elected to the Legislative Assembly of the Gold Coast in 1951. 38 of the members were elected directly by the general population and 37 others elected by territorial councils. There were in addition 3 ex-officio members appointed by the Governor of the Gold Coast and six others representing commercial interests.
The CPP won all the 5 seats from the urban areas and 29 of the 33 seats from the rural areas. It also had the support of enough of the members representing the territorial council to control a total of 56 out of the 84 seats in the assembly.

Composition

List of MPs elected in the general election
The following table is a list of MPs elected on 8 February 1951 in the Gold Coast.



Notes and references

See also
Parliament of Ghana
 1951 Gold Coast legislative election

External links and sources
African Elections Database

 
1951